Bher Ahir is a village situated in the Gujar Khan Tehsil of Rawalpindi District, of Punjab, Pakistan. Its geographical coordinates are 33° 13' 0 North and 73° 4' 0 East.

Most of the population is Muslim, and belongs to the Ahir tribe.

References 

Populated places in Rawalpindi District